Karl Maria Alexander, 9th Prince of Auersperg, Duke of Gottschee (26 February 1859 in Vienna - 19 October 1927 in Goldegg; from 1919 Karl Maria Alexander Auersperg)  was an Austrian landowner and politician.

Biography 
Karl Maria Alexander was heir to the influential mediatized House of Auersperg. His father, Prince Adolf of Auersperg was Minister-President of Austria. The same position was held by his uncle Prince Karl Wilhelm of Auersperg. He was cavalry master of the reserve, Chief Treasurer and Chief Land-marshal in Carniola and the Windic March, as well as a Privy Councilor.

From 1894 to 1902 he was a member of the Landtag of Lower Austria as the representative of the constitutionally loyal landowners. In 1891 he succeeded his uncle Prince Karl Wilhelm as hereditary member of the House of Lords (Herrenhaus), where he became the House's vice-president and leader of the Constitutional Party from 1897 to 1907.

As a member of the Reichsrat he represented the constituency of Gottschee in the Austrian House of Representatives from 1907 to 1911. He represented agricultural interests as President of the agricultural society and firmly opposed the introduction of universal suffrage.

Family
He was the son of Prince Adolf Wilhelm Daniel of Auersperg (1821-1885) and Countess Johanna Festetics de Tolna (1830-1884). On the death of his uncle, Prince Karl Wilhem, he became 9th Prince of Auersperg, Duke of Gottschee, Princely Count of Wels.

In 1885 he married Countess Eleonore von , daughter of Count August von Breunner-Enkevoirth, with whom he had five children. Their elder son Adolf (1886-1923) continued the main Princely line, the younger son Karl (1895-1980) took the name Prinz von Auersperg-Breunner as adoptive son of his aunt, Countess Ernestine Coudenhove (born Countess Breunner), and founded a cadet branch.
 Prince Adolf of Auersperg (1886–1923), married (1914) to Countess Gabrielle von Clam und Gallas (their son, Karl Adolf, 10th Prince of Auersperg, married Countess Feodore of Solms-Baruth, daughter of Princess Adelaide of Schleswig-Holstein-Sonderburg-Glücksburg and had issue)
 Princess Agathe of Auersperg (1888–1973), married (1913) to Alexander, 5th Prince of Schönburg-Hartenstein, son of Prince Alois Schönburg-Hartenstein
 Princess Johanna of Auersperg (1890–1967), married (1917) to Count Rudolf of Meran, son of Count Franz of Meran
 Princess Eleonore of Auersperg (1892–1967), married (1919) to Erwin Wallner
 Prince Karl von Auersperg-Breunner (1895–1980), married (1927) to Countess Henriette of Meran and had issue

Honours
 : Knight of the Order of the Golden Fleece, 1900

References

External links
 

1859 births
1927 deaths
Austrian princes
Knights of the Golden Fleece of Austria